The Biographical Dictionary of the Extreme Right Since 1890 is a reference book by Philip Rees, on leading people in the various far right movements since 1890.
It contains entries for what the author regards as "the 500 major figures on the radical right, extreme right, and revolutionary right from 1890 to the present" (publisher's blurb).
It was published, as a 418-page hardcover, in New York by Simon & Schuster in 1990.

In the introduction Rees discusses his criterion for inclusion in the book.  He describes the extreme right as "opposed to parliamentary forms of democratic representation and hostile to pluralism."(xvii)
Among those it covers are Argentinian nationalists, Mexican sinarquistas, American nativist demagogues, Brazilian Integralists, German National Socialists, Portuguese National Syndicalists, Spanish Falangists, and Belgian Rexists.


A - B - C - D - E - F - G - H - I - J - K - L - M - N -    O - P - Q - R - S - T - U -   V - W - X - Y - Z

Entries

A
  ABASCAL, Salvador (1910–2000) Leading member of the National Synarchist Union.
  ABETZ, Otto (1903–1958) Nazi German ambassador.
  ACERBO, Giacomo (1888–1969) Fascist economist.
  ALBIÑANA Y SANZ, José Maria (1883–1936) Nationalist politician.
  ALFIERI, Dino (1886–1966) Fascist politician.
  AL-HUSAYNI, Muhammad Amin, Mufti of Jerusalem (aka Al-Hajj Amin) (1895–1974) Pro-Nazi Grand Mufti of Jerusalem.
  ALMEIDA BRAGA, Luis Carlos de Lima de (1890–1970) Founder of Integralismo Lusitano.
  ALMIRANTE, Giorgio (1914–1988) Founder and leader of the Italian Social Movement.
  AMADEO, Mario (1914–1988) Nationalist cabinet minister.
  AMANN, Max (1891–1957) SS Officer.
  AMAUDRUZ, Gaston Armand (1920–2018) Founder of the New European Order.
  ANNALA, Vilho (1888–1960) Chairman of Patriotic People's Movement and Cabinet Minister.
  ANQUÍN, Nimio de (1896–1979) Thomist writer and leader of Union National Fascista.
  ANSALDO VEJERANO, Juan Antonio (1910–1958) Monarchist and Falangist activist and aviator.
  ARCAND, Adrien (1899–1967) Founder of the Parti national social chrétien.
  ARPINATI, Leandro (1892–1945) Fascist politician.
  ARRESE Y MARGA, José Luis de (1905–1986) Falangist.
  AUGIER, Marc (known as Saint-Loup) (1908–1990) Writer active with the Legion of French Volunteers Against Bolshevism.
  AXMANN, Artur (1913–1996) Leader of the Hitler Youth.
  AZNAR GERNER, Agustin (1911–1984) Falangist politician.

B
  BAARS, Jan (1903–1989) General Dutch Fascist League founder.
  BACKE, Herbert (1896–1947) SS Officer.
  BAINVILLE, Jacques (1879–1936) Action Française politician.
  BAKY, László (1898–1946) Hungarian National Socialist Party politician and collaborator.
  BALBO, Italo (1896–1940) Leading fascist and apparent successor to Mussolini.
  BARBÉ, Henri (1902–1966) Parti Populaire Français politician.
  BARBIE, Niklaus (Klaus) (1913–1991) SS Officer known as the 'Butcher of Lyon'.
  BARDÈCHE, Maurice (1909–1998) Leading ideologue of neo-fascism.
  BARRÈS, Auguste Maurice (1862–1923) Anti-Semitic politician and writer.
  BARROSO, Gustavo Dodt (1888–1959) Brazilian Integralism politician and writer.
  BARTELS, Adolf (1862–1945) Journalist and author.
  BENN, Gottfried (1886–1956) Pro-Nazi poet and novelist.
  BENOIST, Alain Marie de (1943- ) Nouvelle Droite philosopher.
  BENOIST-MÉCHIN, Jacques Michel Gabriel Paul (1901–1983) Collaborationist.
  BERGER, Gottlob (1896–1975) Head of the SS-Hauptamt.
  BEST, Karl Rudolf Werner (1903–1989) Leading figure in the occupation of Denmark.
  BIANCHI, Michele (1883–1930) Fascist.
  BIÉTRY, Pierre (1872–1918) Pioneer of 'Yellow socialism'.
  BIGGINI, Carlo Alberto (1902–1945) Fascist Minister of Education.
  BINET, René Valentin (1913–1957) Jeune Nation and New European Order politician.
  BLOKZIJL, Marius Hugh Louis Wilhelm (1884–1946) Pro-Nazi radio broadcaster.
  BLUNCK, Hans Friedrich (1888–1961) Pro-Nazi writer.
  BOCCHINI, Arturo (1880–1940) Head of Polizia di Stato.
  BÖCKEL, Otto (1859–1923) Independent anti-Semitic politician.
  BOMBACCI, Nicolò (1879–1945) Early ally of Mussolini and Italian Social Republic figure.
  BORGHESE, Junio Valerio (1906–1974) Fascist admiral and coup leader.
  BORMANN, Martin (1900–1945) Head of the Nazi Party Chancellery and Private Secretary to Hitler.
  BÖSZÖRMÉNY, Zoltán (1893-?) Scythe Cross leader.
  BOTTAI, Giuseppe (1895–1959) Fascist economist.
  BOUHLER, Phillip (1899–1944) SS officer and head of Action T4.
  BRASILLACH, Robert (1909–1945) Collaborator.
  BRINON, Fernand de (1885–1947) Collaborator.
  BUCARD, Marcel (1895–1946) Leader of the Mouvement Franciste.
  BUCH, Walter (1883–1949) SS Officer.
  BÜRCKEL, Josef (1895–1944) Nazi politician and SS Officer.
  BUFFARINI-GUIDI, Guido (1895–1945) Fascist politician.

C
  CAETANO, Marcelo José das Neves Alves (1906–1980) Prime Minister.
  CANARIS, Wilhelm Franz (1887–1945) Head of the Abwehr and member of the German resistance.
  CARLBERG, Carl Ernfried (1889–1962) Pro-Nazi politician.
  CARULLA, Juan Emiliano (1888–1968) Nationalist politician.
  CÉLINE, Louis-Ferdinand (pseud.) (Louis-Ferdinand Destouches) (1894–1961) Anti-Semitic writer.
  CELMIŅŠ, Gustavs (1899–1968) Founder and leader of Pērkonkrusts.
  CHAMBERLAIN, Houston Stewart (1855–1927) British-born racialist philosopher.
  CHARBONNEAU, Henry (1913–1982) Collaborationist writer.
  CHATEAUBRIANT, Alphonse de (1877–1951) Breton nationalist.
  CHESTERTON, Arthur Keith (1896–1973) British Union of Fascists politician and first leader of the British National Front.
  CIANETTI, Tullio (1899–1976) President of the Confederation of Italian Unions.
  CIANO, Galeazzo, Count of Cortellazo (1903–1944) Italian Minister of Foreign Affairs.
  CLASS, Heinrich (1868–1953) President of the Alldeutscher Verband.
  CLAUSEN, Frits (1893–1947) Leader of the National Socialist Workers' Party of Denmark.
  CLEMENTI, Pierre (1910–1982) Collaborationist journalist.
  CODREANU, Corneliu Zelea (1899–1938) Leader of the Iron Guard.
  COLLINS, Seward B. (1899–1952) Fascist publisher.
  COPPOLA, Francesco (1878–1957) Fascist journalist.
  CORRADINI, Enrico (1865–1931) Italian Nationalist Association founder.
  COSTAMAGNA, Carlo (1881–1965) Theorist of corporatism.
  COSTANTINI, Pierre Dominique (1889–1986) Founder of the French League.
  COSTON, Henry Georges (1910–2001) Action Française and Parti Populaire Français activist.
  COTY, François (1874–1934) Solidarité Française founder.
  COUGHLIN, Charles Edward, Father (1891–1979) Anti-Semitic radio priest.
  COUSTEAU. Pierre-Antoine (1906–1958) Collaborationist writer.
  CUZA, Alexandre C. (1857–1946) National-Christian Defense League leader.

D
  D'ALQUEN, Gunter (1910–1998) Editor of Das Schwarze Korps.
  DALUEGE, Kurt (1897–1946) Leading Police figure.
  D'ANNUNZIO, Gabriele (1863–1938) Precursor of Italian fascism.
  DARNAND, Aimé Joseph Auguste (1897–1945) Commander of Milice.
  DARQUIER DE PELLEPOIX, Louis (1897–1980) Anti-Semitic collaborator.
  DARRÉ, Richard Walther (1895–1953) Agriculture Minister of Germany.
  DAUDET, Léon (1867–1942) Action Française activist.
  DAVILA Y FERNANDEZ DE CELIS, Sancho (1905–1972) Falangist politician.
  DAYE, Pierre (1892–1960) Rexist.
  DÉAT, Marcel (1894–1955) Leader of the National Popular Rally.
  DE BONO, Emilio (1866–1944) Fascist General.
  DE CLERCQ, Jeroom Gustaaf (known as Staff) (1884–1942) Co-founder of the Flemish National Union.
  DEGRELLE, Léon (1906–1994) Leader of Rexism, Waffen-SS soldier and CEDADE activist.
  DELLE CHIAIE, Stefano (1936–2019) Activist with National Vanguard and Ordine Nuovo and figure in the 'Strategy of tension'.
  DELONCLE, Eugene (1890–1944) Founder of La Cagoule.
  DE MAN, Hendrik (Henri) (1885–1953) Collaborator.
  DE MARSANICH, Augusto (1893–1973) Leader of the Italian Social Movement.
  DENIS, Jean Marie Louis Ghislain (1902–1992) Rexist ideologue.
  DENNIS, Lawrence (1893–1977) Fascist writer and diplomat.
  DÉROULÈDE, Paul Marie Joseph (1846–1914) writer, figurehead of the Ligue des Patriotes
  DE STEFANI, Alberto (1873–1969) National Fascist Party politician.
  DE VECCHI, Cesare Maria (1884–1959) Commander of the Blackshirts.
  DIETRICH, Josef (known as Sepp) (1892–1966) SS Officer and bodyguard of Hitler.
  DIETRICH, Otto (1897–1952) Press Chief.
  DILLING, Elizabeth (1894–1966) Anti-Semitic writer and defendant at the Great Sedition Trial of 1944.
  DMOWSKI, Roman (1864–1939) Founder of National Democracy.
  DOCHEV, Ivan Dimitrov (1906–2005) Union of Bulgarian National Legions leader and Anti-communist.
  DÖNITZ, Karl (1891–1980) Admiral and successor to Hitler.
  DONTSOV, Dmytro (1883–1973) Writer and inspiration of Organization of Ukrainian Nationalists.
  DORGÈRES, Henri Auguste (pseud.) (Henri d'Halluin) (1897–1985) Pro-fascist activist.
  DORIOT, Jacques (1898–1945) Leader of the Parti Populaire Français.
  DREXLER, Anton (1884–1942) Nazi Party founder.
  DRIEU LA ROCHELLE, Pierre (1893–1945) Pro-fascist writer and activist.
  DRUMONT, Edouard Adolphe (1844–1917) Founder of the Antisemitic League of France.
  DUBROVIN, Aleksandr Ivanovich (1855–1918) Leader of the Union of the Russian People.
  DUESTERBURG, Theodor (1875–1950) Deputy Leader of Der Stahlhelm.
  DUMINI, Amerigo (1894–1967) Fascist assassin.
  DUPRAT, François (1941–1978) Occident and Ordre Nouveau activist and founder member of the Front National.
  DURCANSKY, Ferdinand (1906–1974) Slovak People's Party politician and collaborator.

E
  EÇA DE QUEIRÓS, António (1891–1968) Writer and Estado Novo official.
  ECKART, Dietrich (1868–1923) Early Nazi Party ideologue.
  EDMONDSON, Robert Edward (1872–1959) Anti-Semitic writer and defendant at the Great Sedition Trial of 1944.
  EFFINGER, Virgil (1873–1955) Leader of the Black Legion.
  EHRHARDT, Arthur (1896–1971) SS Officer and founder of Nation Europa.
  EHRHARDT, Hermann (1881–1971) Marinebrigade Ehrhardt commander.
  EICHMANN, Adolf (1906–1962) SS Officer and leading figure in The Holocaust.
  EKSTRÖM, Martin Eugen (1887–1954) Leader of the National Socialist Bloc.
  ELIAS, Hendrik Joesf (1902–1973) Flemish National Union activist.
  ENDRE, László (1895–1946) Hungarian National Defence Association and Hungarian National Socialist Party activist and collaborator.
  ENGDAHL, Per Claes Sven Edward (1909–1994) New Swedish Movement leader and founder member of the European Social Movement.
  EPP, Franz Xavier (1868–1947) Leading Nazi in Bavaria.
  ERIKSSON, Elof (1883–1965) National Socialist People's Party of Sweden politician.
  ESCHERICH, Georg (1870–1941) Leader of the Bavarian Einwohnerwehr and the Organisation Escherich.
  ESSER, Hermann (1900–1981) Editor of the Völkischer Beobachter.
  ETCHECOPAR, Máximo (1912–2002) Nationalist writer and diplomat.
  EVOLA, Giulio Cesare Andrea (1898–1974) Esoteric Traditionalist School philosopher.

F
  FARINACCI, Roberto (1892–1945) National Fascist Party politician.
  FEDER, Gottfried (1883–1941) Early Nazi Party economist.
  FEDERZONI, Luigi (1878–1967) National Fascist Party politician.
  FERNÁNDEZ CUESTA Y MERELO, Raimundo (1897–1992) Falangist politician and diplomat.
  FERRETTI DI VAL D'ERA, Lando (1895–1977) Fascist journalist.
  FESTETICS, Sándor, Count (1882–1956) Hungarian National Socialist Party politician.
  FEY, Emil (1886–1938) Leader of the Heimwehr and Vice-Chancellor of Austria.
  FILLIOL, Jean Paul Robert (1909–?) Camelots du Roi and La Cagoule activist.
  FINZI, Aldo (1891–1944) Jewish member of the National Fascist Party.
  FLORIAN, Friedrich Karl (1894–1975) Nazi Gauleiter.
  FLYG, Nils Svante (1891–1943) Pro-Nazi communist.
  FONJALLAZ, Arthur Robert Gaston (1875–1944) Supporter of Italian Fascism.
  FONTENOY, Jean (1899–1945) National Popular Rally politician.
  FORGES DAVANZATI, Roberto (1880–1936) Italian Nationalist Association and National Fascist Party politician.
  FORSTER, Albert (1902–1952) Nazi Gauleiter in the Free City of Danzig.
  FRANCO y Bahamonde, Francisco (1892–1975) Leader of the Falange Española Tradicionalista y de las Juntas de Ofensiva Nacional-Sindicalista and its successor the Movimiento Nacional, dictator of Spain, known as El Caudillo.
  FRANÇOIS, Josephus Alphonsus Marie (1901–1996) Verdinaso activist.
  FRANK, Hans (1900–1946) Leader of the General Government.
  FRANK, Karl Hermann (1898–1946) Sudeten German Nazi.
  FRAUENFELD, Alfred Eduard (1898–1977) Nazi Party politician and official for Nazi Germany.
  FREY, Gerhard Michael (1933–2013) Founder and chairman of the German People's Union.
  FRICK, Wilhelm (1877–1946) Nazi Interior Minister.
  FRITSCH, Theodor (1852–1933) Anti-Semitic writer.
  FULLER, John Frederick Charles (1878–1966) Tank warfare pioneer and British Union of Fascists politician.
  FUNK, Walther Emmanuel (1890–1960) Nazi Minister of Economic Affairs.
  FURUGÅRD, Birger (1887–1961) Swedish National Socialist Farmers' and Workers' Party leader.

G
  GAJDA, Radola (formerly Rudolf Geidl) (1892–1948) Leader of the National Fascist Community.
  GALBIATI, Enzo Emilio (1897–1982) Head of the Blackshirts.
  GÁLVEZ, Manuel (1882–1962) Nationalist writer.
  GAMERO DEL CASTILLO, Pedro (1910–1984) Falangist and later monarchist conspirator.
  GEELKERKEN, Cornelis van (1901–1979) Co-founder of the National Socialist Movement in the Netherlands.
  GENECHTEN, Robert van (1895–1945) Writer.
  GENTILE, Giovanni (1875–1944) Philosopher of Actual Idealism.
  GIMÉNEZ CABALLERO, Ernesto (1899–1988) Early fascist writer.
  GIRÓN DE VELASCO, José Antonio (1911–1995) Falangist Minister.
  GIULIETTI, Giuseppe (1879–1953) Head of the Seaman's Union.
  GIUNTA, Francesco (1887–1971) National Fascist Party politician.
  GIURIATI, Giovanni Battista (1876–1970) National Fascist Party politician.
  GLIMMERVEEN, Joop (1928-) Leader of the Dutch People's Union.
  GLOBOCNIK, Odilo (1904–1945) Nazi Party politician and SS and Police Leader.
  GOEBBELS, Paul Joseph (1897–1945) Reich Minister of Propaganda.
  GÖRING, Hermann Wilhelm (1893–1946) Minister of many portfolios and head of the Luftwaffe
  GOGA, Octavian (1881–1938) Pro-fascist Prime Minister of Romania.
  GÖMBÖS, Gyula (1886–1936) Founder of Hungarian National Defence Association and Prime Minister of Hungary
  GONZÁLEZ von Marées, Jorge (1900–1962) Leader of the National Socialist Movement of Chile.
  GRANDI, Dino, Conte di Mordano (1895–1988) Fascist Cabinet Minister.
  GRAY, Ezio Maria (1885–1969) Italian Nationalist Association and National Fascist Party politician.
  GRAZIANI, Rodolfo (1882–1955) General in North African campaigns.
  GREISER, Arthur Karl (1897–1946) Leading figure in The Holocaust.
  GRIMM, Hans (1875–1959) Pro-Nazi writer.
  GROHÉ, Josef (1902–1988) Nazi Gauleiter.
  GÜNTHER, Hans Friedrich Karl (1891–1968) Eugenicist.
  GUÉRIN, Jules-Napoléon (1860–1910) Leader of the Antisemitic League of France.
  GUIRAUD, Paul (1850–1907) Historian.
  GUMMERUS, Herman Gregorius (1877–1948) Founder of the Patriotic People's Movement.

H
  HABICHT, Theodor (1898–1944) Nazi Party politician.
  HAGELIN, Albert Viljam (1881–1946) Nasjonal Samling politician and collaborator.
  HAIGHTON, Coenrad Alfred Augustus (1896–1943) Fascist leader.
  HAMSUN, Knut (pseud.) (Knut Pedersen) (1859–1952) Pro-German writer.
  HARRER, Karl (1890–1926) Founder member of the German Workers' Party.
  HAUSHOFER, Karl Ernst (1869–1946) Theorist of geopolitics.
  HEDILLA LARREY, Manuel (1902–1970) Falangist 'Old Shirt'.
  HEIDEGGER, Martin (1889–1976) Philosopher linked to Nazism.
  HELANEN, Vilho Veikko Päiviö (1899–1952) Member of the Academic Karelia Society.
  HENLEIN, Konrad (1898–1945) Sudeten German leader.
  HENNE, Rolf (1901–1966) National Front and National Movement of Switzerland leader.
  HENRIOT, Philippe (1889–1944) Collaborator.
  HERMANS, Cornelius Eduardus (1897–1992) Flemish National Union politician.
  HÉROLD-PAQUIS, Jean (1912–1945) Parti Populaire Français member.
  HESS, Walter Richard Rudolf (1894–1987) Deputy leader of Nazi Germany, he flew to the United Kingdom on a peace mission in 1941.
  HEYDRICH, Reinhard Tristan Eugen (1904–1942) Chief of the RSHA.
  HILDEBRAND, Friedrich (1898–1948) Nazi Gauleiter and SS Officer.
  HILTL, Hermann (1872–1930) Leader of the Frontkämpfervereiningung paramilitary group.
  HIMMLER, Heinrich (1900–1945) Reichsführer-SS, Chief of the German Police and Minister of the Interior
  HITLER, Adolf (1889–1945) Leader of the Nazi Party and dictator of Nazi Germany, known as Führer.
  HJORT, Johan Bernhard (1895–1969) Co-founder of the Nasjonal Samling.
  HOESS, Rudolf Franz Ferdinand (1900–1947) Commandant of Auschwitz concentration camp.
  HOORNAERT, Paul (1888–1944) Early fascist leader.
  HUGENBERG, Alfred (1865–1951) German National People's Party leader and member of Hitler's first cabinet.

I
  IBARGUREN, Carlos (1877–1956) Writer.
  IMRÉDY, Béla (1891–1946) Prime Minister of Hungary and collaborator.
  INTERLANDI, Telesio (1894–1965) Anti-Semitic journalist.
  IRAZUSTA, Julio Alberto Gustavo (1899–1982) and IRAZUSTA, Rodolfo (1897–1967) Politicians and writers.

J
  JAROSS, Andor (1896–1946) Collaborator.
  JEANTET, Claude (1902–1982) Action Française activist.
  JORDAN, Rudolf (1902–1988) Nazi Gauleiter.
  JOYCE, William Brooke (1906–1946) British Union of Fascists politician, National Socialist League leader and Nazi radio broadcaster as 'Lord Haw-Haw'.
  JUNG, Rudolf (1882–1945) German Workers' Party, Deutsche Nationalsozialistische Arbeiterpartei and Nazi Party politician.
  JÜNGER, Ernst (1895–1998) Conservative Revolutionary movement writer.

K
  KAHANE, Meir (Martin David) (1932–1990) Founder and leader of Kach and Kahane Chai.
  KALTENBRUNNER, Ernst (1903–46) Head of the RSHA and President of Interpol.
  KANZLER, Rudolf (1873–1956) Freikorps leader.
  KAPP, Wolfgang (1858–1922) Founder of the Fatherland Party and notional leader of the Kapp Putsch.
  KAUFMANN, Karl (1900–1969) Nazi Gauleiter.
  KELLER, Carlos (1898–1974) National Socialist Movement of Chile founder and ideologue.
  KERNMAYER, Erich (1906–1991) Revisionist writer and Socialist Reich Party politician.
  KIRDORF, Emil (1847–1938) Pro-Nazi industrialist.
  KITA, Ikki (pseud.) (Kita Terujiro) (1883–1937) Nationalist writer.
  KJELLEN, Rudolf (1864–1922) Pioneer of geopolitics.
  KLAUSNER, Hubert (1892–1939) Nazi Gauleiter.
  KOCH, Erich (1896–1986) Nazi Gauleiter.
  KOCH, Pietro (1918–1945) National Fascist Party policeman.
  KOLBENHEYER, Erwin Guido (1878–1962) Pro-Nazi novelist.
  KOSOLA, Vihtori Iisakki (1884–1936) Leader of the Lapua Movement.
  KRATZENBERG, Damian (1878–1946) Leader of the Volksdeutsche Bewegung.
  KRÜGER, Gerhard (1908-1994 ) Socialist Reich Party politician.
  KUBE, Wilhelm (1887–1943) Nazi Party politician.
  KUHN, Fritz (1896–1951) Leader of the German American Bund.

L
  LAGARDELLE, Jean-Baptiste Joseph Hubert (1874–1958) Syndicalist writer and collaborator.
  LAMMERS, Hans-Heinrich (1879–1962) Head of the Reich Chancellery.
  LANGBEHN, August Julius (1851–1907) Conservative historian.
  LANGE, Friedrich (1852-1917) Anti-Semitic writer and activist.
  LANGOTH, Franz (1877–1953) Nazi Party politician and Federation of Independents member.
  LANZ, Adolf Josef (known as Jörg Lanz von Liebenfels) (1874–1955) Anti-Semitic mystic and publisher of Ostara.
  LANZILLO, Agostino (1886–1952) National Fascist Party politician.
  LA ROCQUE DE SEVERAC, François, Comte de (1885–1946) Leader of Croix-de-Feu and French Social Party.
  LAROUCHE, Lyndon Hermyle (1922-2019) Economist and head of the LaRouche movement.
  LEDESMA Ramos, Ramiro (1905–1936) National syndicalist writer.
  LEEMANS, Victor Louis (1901–1971) Verdinaso activist and theorist of the Conservative Revolutionary movement.
  LEERS, Johann von (1902–1965) Anti-Semitic academic.
  LEESE, Arnold Spencer (1877–1956) Leader of the Imperial Fascist League.
  LEMBCKE, Cay (1885–1965) Leader of the National Socialist Workers' Party of Denmark.
  LEONHARDT, Ernst (1885–1945) Pro-Nazi National Front politician.
  LEOPOLD, Josef (1889–1941) Nazi Party politician.
  LE PEN, Jean-Marie (1928-) Poujadist and National Centre of Independents and Peasants politician and founder and leader of the National Front.
  LEY, Robert (1890–1945) Head of the German Labour Front.
  LIE, Jonas (1899–1945) Writer.
  LINDHOLM, Sven Olov (1903–1998) National Socialist People's Party of Sweden politician.
  LIST, Guido Karl Anton von (1848–1919) Occultist and völkisch writer.
  LJOTIĆ, Dimitriye V. (1891–1945) ZBOR leader and collaborator.
  LOHSE, Heinrich (1896–1964) Nazi Party politician.
  LONG, Huey Pierce (the 'Kingfish') (1893–1935) Populist Governor of Louisiana.
  LUCHÁIRE, Jean (1901–1946) Collaborationist journalist.
  LUDENDORFF, Erich Friedrich Wilhelm (1865–1937) General, Nazi Party and National Socialist Freedom Movement politician and leader of the Tannenbergbund.
  LUEGER, Karl (1844–1910) Anti-Semitic Mayor of Vienna.
  LUGONES, Leopoldo (1874–1938) Conservative writer.
  LUKOV, Hristo Nikolov (1887–1943) Leader of the Union of Bulgarian National Legions.
  LUNDE, Gulbrand Oscar Johan (1901–1942) Collaborator.
  LUTKIE, Wouter Leonardus (1887–1968) Pro-fascist priest.
  LUTZE, Viktor (1890–1943) Commander of the Sturmabteilung.

M
  MACH, Alexander (1902–1980) Slovak People's Party politician.
  McWILLIAMS, Joseph E. (1904–1996) Fascist politician.
  MAEZTU Y WHITNEY, Ramiro (1875–1936) Nationalist writer.
  MAHRAUN, Arthur (1890–1950) Young German Order leader.
  MALAPARTE, Curzio (pseud.) (Karl Erich Suckert) (1898–1957) Fascist journalist.
  MALLIARAKAS, Jean Gilles (1944-) Founder of Third Way.
  MANOILESCU, Minail (1891–1950) Foreign Minister and theorist of Corporatism.
  MARAVIGLIA, Maurizio (1878–1955) Early Fascist politician.
  MARIN, Vasile (1904–1937) National Peasants' Party and Iron Guard politician.
  MARINELLI, Giovanni (1879–1944) Fascist.
  MARINETTI, Filippo Tommaso (1876–1944) Early Fascist philosopher.
  MARION, Paul Jules André (1899–1954) Parti Populaire Français politician and collaborator.
  MARKOV, Nikolai Evgenevich (1866–1945) Leading Union of the Russian People activist and later supporter of Nazism.
  MARQUET, Adrien Théodore Ernest (1885–1955) Neosocialist.
  MATTHYS, Victor Hubert (1914–1947) Deputy leader of Rexism.
  MAULNIER, Thierry (1908–1988) Action Française activist.
  MAURRAS, Charles Marie Photius (1862–1952) Leader of Action Française.
  MAXENCE, Jean-Pierre (1906–1956) Writer.
  MEIJER, Arnold Joseph (1905–1965) Zwart Front politician.
  MEINVIELLE, Julio (1905–1979) Anti-Semitic writer and Tacuara Nationalist Movement ideologue.
  MERCOURIS, George S. (1886–1943) Founder of the Greek National Socialist Party.
  MESKÖ, Zoltán (1883–1959) Hungarian National Socialist Party leader.
  METAXAS, Ioannis (1871–1941) Dictator of the 4th of August Regime.
  MEZZASOMA, Fernando (1907–1945) Fascist journalist.
  MICHELINI, Arturo (1909–1969) Leader of the Italian Social Movement.
  MISHIMA, Yukio (pseud.) (Kimitake Hiraoka) (1925–1970) Author and leader of the Tatenokai.
  MOELLER VAN DEN BRUCK, Arthur (1876–1925) Author of Das Dritte Reich.
  MOLIN, Adrian Leopold (1880–1942) Anti-emigration campaigner.
  MONSARAZ, Alberto de (1889–1959) Chairman of the National Syndicalists.
  MORÉS, Antoine Amadée Marie Vincent Manca, Marquis de Vallambrosa (1858–1896) Founder of the Antisemitic League of France.
  MOSELEY, George Van Horn (1874–1960) Army General and anti-Semite.
  MOSLEY, Sir Oswald Ernald (1896–1980) Founder and leader of the New Party, the British Union of Fascists and the Union Movement.
  MOŢA, Ion (1902–1936) Deputy leader of the Iron Guard.
  MÜLLER, Heinrich (1900–45) Head of the Gestapo.
  MUÑOZ GRANDES, Agustin (1896–1970) Falangist cabinet minister and commander of the Blue Division.
  MUSSERT, Anton Adriaan (1894–1946) National Socialist Movement in the Netherlands leader and collaborator.
  MUSSOLINI, Benito Amilcare Andrea (1883–1945) Dictator of Fascist Italy and the Italian Social Republic, known as Il Duce.
  MUTI, Ettore (1902–43) Secretary of the National Fascist Party.

N
  NEBE, Arthur (1894–1945) SS Officer and President of Interpol.
  NEUBACHER, Hermann (1893–1960) Nazi Party activist and official in the Nazi German occupation of the Balkans.
  NIEKISCH, Ernst (1889–1967) Pioneer of National Bolshevism.
  NOTHOMB, Pierre (1887–1966) Hard-line Catholic politician and writer.

O
  O'DUFFY, Eoin (1892–1944) Leader of the Blueshirts, Fine Gael and the Irish Brigade of the Spanish Civil War.
  OEHLER, Hans (1888–1967) Pro-Nazi member of the New Front, Volkspartei der Schweiz and other groups.
  OHLENDORF, Otto (1908–1951) Waffen-SS and Sicherheitsdienst Officer.
  OLIVETTI, Angelo Oliveiri (1874–1931) Fascist journalist.
  OLTRAMARE, Georges (1896–1960) National Union founder and collaborator in France.
  ORANO, Paolo (1875–1945) Anti-Semitic writer.

P
  PABST, Waldemar (1880–1970) Anti-communist soldier and Austrian Heimwehr organiser.
  PALACIO, Ernesto (1900–1979) Writer.
  PÁLFFY, Fidél, Count (1895–1946) Hungarian National Socialist Party leader and collaborationist Minister.
  PANUNZIO, Sergio (1886–1944) Theorist of syndicalism and fascism.
  PAPEN, Franz von (1879–1969) Centre Party politician, Chancellor of Germany and Nazi diplomat.
  PAPINI, Giovanni (1881–1956) Pro-Fascist writer.
  PAVELIĆ, Ante (1889–1959) Head of the Independent State of Croatia.
  PAVOLINI, Alessandro (1903–1945) National Fascist Party politician.
  PELLEY, William Dudley (1890–1965) Founder of the Silver Legion of America.
  PEQUITO REBELO, José Adriano (1892–1983) Integralismo Lusitano politician.
  PERRONE COMPAGNI, Dino (1879–1950) Early Fascist leader.
  PFRIMER, Walter (1881–1968) Heimwehr leader.
  PIASECKI, Boleslaw (1915–1979) Leader of the National Radical Camp Falanga.
  PIÑAR LOPEZ, Blas (1918–2014) Movimiento Nacional official and leader of the Fuerza Nueva and the Frente Nacional.
  PINI, Giorgio (1899–1987) Fascist historian.
  PIROW, Oswald (1890–1959) Pro-Nazi Cabinet Minister.
  POUJADE, Pierre Marie Raymond (1920–2003) Leader of anti-tax group the Union de Defense Commercants et Artisans.
  POULET, Robert (1893–1989) Pro-Nazi journalist.
  POUND, Ezra (1885–1972) Modernist poet and fascist sympathiser.
  PRAT ECHAURREN, Jorge (1918–1971) Rightist politician.
  ROLÃO PRETO, Francisco de Barcelos (1893–1977) Leader of the National Syndicalists
  PREZIOSI, Giovanni (1881–1945) Fascist and racialist writer.
  PREZZOLINI, Giuseppe (1882–1982) Fascist journalist.
  PRIMO DE RIVERA y Sáenz de Heredia, José Antonio (1903–1936) Leader of the Falange Española.
  PROKSCH, Alfred (1891–1981) Nazi Party leader.
  PRYTZ, Anton Frederick Winter Jakhelln (1878–1945) Collaborationist Minister.
  PUCHEU, Pierre Firmin (1899–1944) Croix-de-Feu and Parti Populaire Français politician, later collaborationist Minister of the Interior.
  PUJO, Maurice (1872–1955) Action Française founder.
  PURISHKEVICH, Vladimir Mitrofanovich (1870–1920) Founder of the Union of the Russian People.

Q
  QUISLING, Vidkun (1887–1945) Nasjonal Samling leader and Nazi collaborator.

R
  RÄIKKÖNEN, Erkki Aleksanteri (1900–1961) Founder of the Patriotic People's Movement.
  RAINER, Friedrich (1903–1947) Nazi Gauleiter.
  RAJNISS, Ferenc (earlier called Rheinisch) (1893–1946) Collaborator.
  RAPOSO, José Hipólito (1885–1953) Writer and founder of Integralismo Lusitano.
  RAUTI, Giuseppe Umberto (known as Pino) (1926–2012) Leader of the Italian Social Movement, the Ordine Nuovo and the Social Idea Movement.
  REBATET, Lucien (1903–1972) Pro-Nazi Action Française activist.
  REDONDO ORTEGA, Onésimo (1905–1936) Falangist politician.
  REINTHALLER, Anton (1895–1959) Inaugural leader of the Freedom Party of Austria.
  REMER, Otto-Ernst (1912–1997) Soldier and founder of the Socialist Reich Party.
  REVENTLOW, Ernst Christian Einar Ludwig Detlef (1869–1943) German National People's Party and Nazi Party politician.
  RIBBENTROP, Joachim von (1893–1946) Nazi Foreign Minister of Germany.
  RICCI, Renato (1896–1956) National Fascist Party politician.
  RIDRUEJO JIMÉNEZ, Dionisio (1912–1975) Falangist writer.
  RIEHL, Walter (1881–1955) Deutsche Nationalsozialistische Arbeiterpartei and Nazi Party politician.
  RINTELEN, Anton (1876–1946) Christian Social Party politician.
  RIVA-AGÜERO Y OSMA, José de la (1885–1944) Politician and writer.
  ROCCO, Alfredo (1875–1935) Italian Nationalist Association and National Fascist Party politician.
  ROCKWELL, George Lincoln (1918–1967) Founder of the American Nazi Party.
  RODRIGUES, Nicolás (1897–1940) Leader of the Gold shirts.
  RÖHM, Ernst (1887–1934) Sturmabteilung leader and victim of the Night of the Long Knives.
  RÖSSLER, Fritz (known as Franz Richter) (1912–1987) Socialist Reich Party founder and member of the European Social Movement.
  ROMUALDI, Pino Nettuno (1913–1988) Italian Social Movement politician.
  ROSENBERG, Alfred (1893–1946) Philosopher of Nazism.
  ROSSI, Cesare (1887–1967) Fascist politician.
  ROSSONI, Edmomdo (1884–1965) Fascist Minister of Agriculture and Forestry.
  ROST VAN TONNINGEN, Meinout Marinus (1894–1945) National Socialist Movement in the Netherlands politician.
  ROTH, Alfred (1879–1940) Leader of the Deutschvölkischer Schutz und Trutzbund.
  RUDEL, Hans-Ulrich (1916–1982) Luftwaffe ace then Deutsche Reichspartei politician.
  RUIZ DE ALDA Y MIQUÉLEZ, Julio (1897–1936) Aviator and Falangist.
  RUST, Bernhard (1883–1945) Chief of Reichserziehungsministerium.
  RYS-ROZSÉVAĊ, Jan (1901–1946) Leader of Vlajka.

S
  SABIANI, Simon Pierre (1888–1956) Parti Populaire Français politician.
  SÁINZ NOTHNAGEL, José (1907–1984) Falangist.
  SÁINZ RODRÍGUEZ, Pedro (1897–1986) Falangist.
  SALAZAR, António de Oliveira (1889–1970) Leader of the Estado Novo.
  SALGADO, Plinio (1895–1975) Founder and leader of Brazilian Integralism.
  SALMIALA, Bruno Aleksandr (1890–1981) Patriotic People's Movement member.
  SALOMON, Ernst Friedrich Karl von (1902–72) Freikorps leader.
  SÁNCHEZ MAZAS, Rafael (1894–1966) Falangist.
  SANTOS COSTA, Fernando (1899–1982) Estado Novo Minister of War.
  SARDINHA, Antonio (1888–1925) Integralismo Lusitano figure.
  SAUCKEL, Fritz Ernst Christoph (1894–1946) General Plenipotentiary for Labour Deployment .
  SCHACHT, Hjalmar Horace Greeley (1877–1970) President of the Reichsbank.
  SCHAFFNER, Jakob (1875–1944) Pro-Nazi novelist.
  SCHELLENBERG, Walter (1910–1952) SS Head of Foreign Intelligence.
  SCHIRACH, Baldur von (1907–1974) Leader of the Hitler Youth.
  SCHMITT, Carl (1888–1985) Professor of law.
  SCHÖNERER, Georg, Ritter von (1842–1921) Pan-German politician.
  SCORZA, Carlo (1897–1988) Secretary of the National Fascist Party.
  SEBOTTENDORF, Rudolf von (pseud.) (Adam Alfred Rudolf Glauer) (1875–1945) Leading member of the Thule Society.
  SELDTE, Franz (1882–1947) Founder and Leader of Der Stahlhelm and Nazi official.
  SERRANO SUÑER, Ramón (1901–2003) Spanish Foreign Minister.
  SEYSS-INQUART, Arthur (1892–1946) Austrian Chancellor and Nazi German official.
  SICARD, Maurice-Yvan (1910–2000) Parti Populaire Français writer known as 'Saint-Paulien'.
  SIDOR, Karol (1901–1953) Slovak People's Party politician.
  SIDOS, Pierre (1927–2020) Founder of Jeune Nation and Occident.
  SIMA, Horia (1907–1993) Second leader of the Iron Guard.
  SIMOJOKI, Lauri Elias (before 1926, Simelius) (1899–1940) Chairman of the Academic Karelia Society and leader of the Patriotic People's Movement youth.
  SIMON, Gustav (1900–1945) Nazi Gauleiter.
  SINCLAIR DE ROCHEMONT, Hugue Alexandre (1901–1942) National Front and National Socialist Dutch Workers Party politician.
  SIRK, Artur (1900–1937) Founder of the Vaps Movement.
  SKANCKE, Ragnard Sigvald (1890–1948) Collaborationist minister.
  SKORZENY, Otto (1908–1975) Nazi adventurer and subsequent paramilitary director.
  SMITH, Gerald Lyman Kenneth (1898–1976) Leading figure in Share Our Wealth and the America First Party.
  SOFFICI, Ardengo (1879–1964) Fascist intellectual.
  SOMERSALO, Arne Sakari (1891–1941) Finnish Air Force pioneer and anti-communist.
  SONDEREGGER, Emil (1898–1934) General and National Front politician.
  SOREL, Georges (1847–1922) Syndicalist philosopher.
  SOULÉS, Georges Raymond (1907–1986) Mouvement Social Révolutionnaire politician and esoteric writer (nom de plume:Raymond Abellio).
  SPANN, Othmar (1878–1950) Philosopher, sociologist and economist.
  SPEER, Albert (1905–1981) Architect and Reich Minister of Armaments and War Production.
  SPENGLER, Oswald (1880–1936) Philosopher and historian.
  SPIRITO, Ugo (1896–1979) Fascist academic of corporatism.
  STALIYSKI, Aleksandar (1893–1945) Collaborator.
  STANG, Axel (1904–1974) Collaborationist minister in Nasjonal Samling government.
  STARACE, Achille (1889–1945) National Fascist Party party secretary.
  STARHEMBERG, Ernst Rüdiger Camillo Maria, 7th Prince of (1899–1956) Freikorps Oberland, Nazi Party and Fatherland's Front activist.
  STEIDLE, Richard (1881–1940) Heimwehr leader.
  STÖCKER, Adolf (1835–1909) Theologian, chaplain to Kaiser Wilhelm II and founder of the Christian Social Party.
  STRASSER, Gregor (1892–1934) Leader of the left-wing of the Nazi Party and victim of the Night of the Long Knives.
  STRASSER, Otto (1897–1974) Dissident Nazi and later head of the German Social Union.
  STREEL, Lucien Alphonse Joseph (known as José) (1911–1946) Rexist journalist.
  STREICHER, Julius (1885–1946) Nazi propagandist and publisher of Der Stürmer.
  STŘIBRNÝ, Jiří (Ferdinand) (1880–1955) Former socialist imprisoned for collaboration.
  STUCKART, Wilhelm (1902–1953) Nazi lawyer and State Secretary.
  SZÁLASI, Ferenc (1897–1946) Collaborator and leader of the Arrow Cross Party.

T
  TAITTINGER, Pierre Charles (1887–1965) Chairman of the Paris council during the German occupation of France.
  TAMBURINI, Tullio (1892–1957) Police chief.
  TERBOVEN, Josef Antonius Heinrich (1898–1945) Reichskommissar of Norway.
  TERRE'BLANCHE, Eugene Ney (1941–2010) Founder and leader of the Afrikaner Weerstandsbeweging.
  THADDEN, Adolf von (1921–1996) Chairman of the National Democratic Party of Germany.
  THIERACK, Otto Georg (1889–1946) Reich Minister of Justice.
  THIRIART, Jean François (1922–1992) Leader of Jeune Europe and later a National Bolshevik.
  TISO, Jozef Gašpar (1887–1947) Slovak People's Party politician and priest.
  TIXIER-VIGNANCOUR, Jean-Louis Gilbert (1907–1989) Vichy government official and independent politician.
  TOBLER, Robert (1901–1962) Chairman of the National Front.
  TODT, Fritz (1881–1942) Founder of the Nazi Organisation Todt.
  TOLLENAERE, Reimond (1909–1942) Flemish National Union politician and SS Officer.
  TSANKOV, Aleksandar (1897–1959) Prime Minister and founder of the National Social Movement.
  TUKA, Vojtech 'Bela' (1880–1946) Prime Minister of the Slovak Republic.
  TURATI, Augusto (1888–1955) Fascist journalist and politician.

U
  ÚNZAGA de la Vega, Óscar (1916–1959) Leader of the Bolivian Socialist Falange.

V
  VACHER DE LAPOUGE, Georges (1854–1936) Eugenicist.
  VALLAT, Xavier (1891–1972) Anti-Semitic collaborationist.
  VALOIS, Georges (pseud.) (Alfred Georges Gressent) (1894–1945) Politician and writer.
  VAN RENSBURG, Johannes Frederik Janse (1898–1966) Leader of the Ossewabrandwag.
  VAN SEVEREN, Georges Edmond Edouard (known as Joris) (1894–1940) Leader of Verdinaso.
  VAUGEOIS, Henri (1864–1916) Founder member of Action Française.
   VEESENMAYER, Edmund (1904–1977) SS Officer and figure in The Holocaust.
  VEGAS LATAPIÉ, Eugenio (1907–1985) Leading member of Acción Española.
  VENNER, Dominique (1935–2013) Organisation armée secrète and Groupement de recherche et d'études pour la civilisation européenne activist.
  VIDUSSONI, Aldo (1914–1982) National Fascist Party politician.
  VOLDEMARAS, Augustinas (1883–1942) Twice Prime Minister.
  VOLPI DI MISURATA, Giuseppe (1877–1947) President of Confindustria.

W
  WAGNER, Adolf (1890–1944) Nazi soldier and politician.
  WAGNER, Josef (1899–1945) Nazi Gauleiter.
  WAGNER, Robert (1895–1946) Nazi Gauleiter and Head of Civil Government in occupied Alsace.
  WALLENIUS, Kurt Martti (1893–1984) Commander of the White Guard.
  WEICHARDT, Louis Theodor (1894–1985) Leader of the Greyshirts.
  WELCH, Robert Henry Winborne (1899–1985) Co-founder of the John Birch Society.
  WESSEL, Horst (1907–1930) Early Nazi martyr.
  WIELE, Jef van de (1903–1979) Nazi activist in Flanders. Co-founder of Devlag.
  WINROD, Gerald Burton (1900–1957) Anti-Semitic evangelist.
  WOLFF, Karl Friedrich Otto (1900–1984) Waffen-SS General.
  WULLE, Reinhold (1882–1950) Founder of the German Völkisch Freedom Party.

Y
  YAGÜE Blanco, Juan Lorenzo Teodoro (1891–1952) Falangist officer.

Z
  ZEHRER, Hans (1899–1966) Editor of Die Tat.

1990 non-fiction books
Biographical dictionaries
Books about the far right
Books by Philip Rees